The House at 91 Coombs Street in Southbridge, Massachusetts was, at the time of its listing on the National Register of Historic Places in 1989, a well-preserved example of a three-decker built early in the 20th century.  Of similar period three-deckers on Coombs Street, it was the only one that had not been significantly altered, with original Queen Anne trim elements, including turned balustrade and porch posts, and decorative stained glass windows.  Since then, it has apparently been demolished; a modern duplex now stands on the property.

See also
National Register of Historic Places listings in Southbridge, Massachusetts
National Register of Historic Places listings in Worcester County, Massachusetts

References

External links
 91 Coombs Street MACRIS Listing

Houses in Southbridge, Massachusetts
Queen Anne architecture in Massachusetts
Houses completed in 1905
National Register of Historic Places in Southbridge, Massachusetts
Demolished buildings and structures in Massachusetts
Houses on the National Register of Historic Places in Worcester County, Massachusetts
1905 establishments in Massachusetts